Théo Bernard François Hernandez (born 6 October 1997) is a French professional footballer who plays as a left-back for  club AC Milan and the France national team. Known for his speed, runs, and goalscoring ability, he is regarded as one of the best left-backs in the world. He is the brother of fellow professional footballer Lucas Hernandez, and their father Jean-François Hernandez was also a footballer.

Club career

Atlético Madrid
Born in Marseille, Hernandez joined Atlético Madrid's academy in 2007, aged nine. After progressing through the youth categories, he was promoted to the reserves in Tercera División in summer 2015.

On 3 February 2016, Hernandez renewed his contract. Two days later, he was called up to the first team for a La Liga match against Eibar due to injuries, but remained an unused substitute in the 3–1 home win.

Alavés
On 4 August 2016, Hernandez extended his contract until 2021, being immediately loaned to fellow league club Deportivo Alavés for one year. He made his professional debut late in the month, starting in a 0–0 home draw with Sporting de Gijón.

On 16 October 2016, Hernandez was given a straight red card in a 1–1 home draw to Málaga after a hard tackle on Ignacio Camacho. He scored his first professional goal the following 7 May, netting the game's only goal in a home victory over Athletic Bilbao.

A regular starter during the Basque team's run in the Copa del Rey, Hernandez helped them reach the final for the first time in their 91-year history. During the decisive match on 27 May 2017, he scored the equaliser through a direct free kick in an eventual 1–3 loss against Barcelona.

Real Madrid
On 5 July 2017, Hernandez signed a six-year deal with Real Madrid after they met his release clause of €24 million. He made his competitive debut on 16 August, replacing Marco Asensio in a 2–0 home win against Barcelona for that year's Supercopa de España.

Hernandez made three appearances during the 2017–18 edition of the UEFA Champions League, helping the club win its third consecutive and 13th overall title in the competition. On 10 August 2018, he was loaned to Real Sociedad.

AC Milan
On 7 July 2019, Hernandez joined Serie A club AC Milan in a deal worth maximum of €20 million. The transfer was approved and carried out by Paolo Maldini, who met with him informally in Ibiza to persuade him to join. Hernandez made his debut on 21 September, playing 18 minutes in the 2–0 defeat against Inter Milan in the Derby della Madonnina. He scored his first goal for the Rossoneri on 5 October, helping the visitors come from behind to win 2–1 at Genoa. During his first season with Milan he managed to score 7 goals in all competitions and had 3 assists.

On 23 December 2020, Hernandez's 93rd-minute winning goal gave AC Milan a victory over Lazio to keep them top of Serie A. During the 2020–21 season, Hernandez was the only defender in the top five European leagues to have scored two braces. He was also the defender with the most successful dribbles in Serie A that season with 73. During his second season with the team, he managed to score 8 goals and assisted 7 in all competitions.

On 6 January 2022, Hernandez wore the captain's armband for the first time against Roma. Three days later, he scored a brace in a 3–0 win against Venezia, becoming first defender to score at least three braces in AC Milan's Serie A history. On 11 February, Hernandez renewed his contract with Milan until 2026.

On 15 May 2022 against Atalanta, Hernandez ran for 95 metres before scoring the second goal of a 2–0 win. A week later, Milan were crowned with their first Serie A title in 11 years, Hernandez's contributions were 5 goals and 6 assists, the most for any defender in Serie A that season.

International career
On 26 August 2021, he received his first call to the France senior squad. He made his debut on 7 September 2021 in a World Cup qualifier against Finland, a 2–0 home victory. He started and played the whole game. In October 2021, ahead of the UEFA Nations League semi-finals against Belgium, Théo for the first time received a call-up to the national team from Didier Deschamps together with his brother Lucas; the two were later fielded in the 3–4–1–2 formation as a left centre-back and a left wing-back, respectively, making it the first time they played together in a senior competitive game. On 7 October, he scored a late-time winner in the 3–2 victory against the aforementioned opponent, sending his team to the final for the first time in history of the tournament.

In November 2022, he was named in the final squad for the 2022 FIFA World Cup in Qatar. On 14 December, he scored a goal in a 2–0 win over Morocco in the semi-final.

Personal life
Hernandez's father, Jean-François, was also a footballer. A centre-back from France, he too played for Atlético Madrid; his older brother Lucas, who plays for Bayern Munich and France, was also developed at the club. In 2022, French newspaper L'Équipe found that Jean-François – who went missing in 2004 – was living in Thailand, and had allegedly been legally blocked by his ex-partner from seeing their children.

He has been dating Italian model Zoe Cristofoli since June 2020. On 8 April 2022, the couple's son Theo Junior was born.

Career statistics

Club

International

Scores and results list France's goal tally first, score column indicates score after each Hernandez goal

Honours

Alavés
Copa del Rey runner-up: 2016–17

Real Madrid
Supercopa de España: 2017
UEFA Champions League: 2017–18
UEFA Super Cup: 2017
FIFA Club World Cup: 2017

AC Milan
Serie A: 2021–22

France
UEFA Nations League: 2020–21
FIFA World Cup runner-up: 2022

Individual
AC Milan Player of the Season: 2019–20
Serie A Team of the Year: 2019–20, 2020–21, 2021–22
Serie A Goal of the Month: May 2022
Serie A Goal of the Season: 2021–22

References

External links

AC Milan official profile

1997 births
Living people
Footballers from Marseille
French footballers
Association football defenders
Atlético Madrid B players
Deportivo Alavés players
Real Madrid CF players
Real Sociedad footballers
A.C. Milan players
Tercera División players
La Liga players
Serie A players
UEFA Champions League winning players
France youth international footballers
France international footballers
2022 FIFA World Cup players
UEFA Nations League-winning players
French expatriate footballers
Expatriate footballers in Italy
Expatriate footballers in Spain
French expatriate sportspeople in Italy
French expatriate sportspeople in Spain
French people of Spanish descent